Michael O. Mastura is a Philippine lawyer, author, and lecturer. He is a descendant of the 16th-century monarch Muhammad Kudarat, also known as Sultan Kudarat of Maguindanao. He served as Representative of the First District of Maguindanao and Cotabato City from 1987 to 1995.

Of Chinese ancestry, his parents migrated to the Philippines in the early 20th century.

He earned his Bachelor of Arts and Bachelor of Law degrees from Notre Dame University in Cotabato City, and his Master of Law degree from the University of the Philippines.

Mike Mastura served as a Delegate to the 1971 Constitutional Convention. In 1981, he was appointed as the first Deputy Minister for the Ministry of Muslim Affairs under Minister Romulo Espaldon. He also became Member of the Board of Regents of Mindanao State University and of the Southern Philippines Development Authority, and Member of the Mindanao Economic Council. He founded the Islamic Welfare Society of the Philippines and the Sultan Kudarat Islamic Academy, and co-founded the Southeast Asian Shariah Law Association. From 1984 to 1986, he was President and Chief Executive Officer of the Al-Amanah Islamic Bank.

He is the older brother of Mayor Tucao O. Mastura of Sultan Kudarat, Maguindanao and Mayor Armando Mastura of Sultan Mastura, Maguindanao.

References

20th-century Filipino lawyers
Living people
Members of the House of Representatives of the Philippines from Maguindanao
Filipino Muslims
Year of birth missing (living people)